Willie and Lady Maisry is Child ballad number 70.

Synopsis

Willie kills the watch on Lady Maisry's father's hall to get to her chamber.  After the night, her father kills him.  Lady Maisry taxes him with it.  He may tell her that Willie killed the guard, but she retorts that they were in armor but Willie was not.

Variants
This ballad has much in common with Clerk Saunders, with some influence from The Bent Sae Brown.

References

Child Ballads
Year of song unknown
Songwriter unknown